Elisabetta Trenta (born 4 June 1967) is an Italian politician who served as the Italian Minister of Defence in the Conte I Cabinet.

Biography
In 1994, Trenta graduated in political science at La Sapienza University of Rome. She also had a master in International Development and a master in Intelligence and security. She worked as an adviser for the mission Ancient Babylon for the Italian Ministry of Defence, and senior expert in the task force in Iraq for the Italian Ministry of Foreign Affairs.

In 2009, Trenta was recalled in service as captain in the UNIFIL mission in Lebanon and in 2012 she coordinated a project in Libya for the reduction of illegal weapons. She is also deputy director of the Master in Intelligence and Security of Link Campus University, and has collaborated with the Military Center for Strategic Studies (CEMISS), focusing particularly on proxy wars.

According to her curriculum, Trenta is engaged in social work through two associations of which she is vice-president: Children of Nassiriya Onlus, which carries out projects in Iraq, and the Flauto Magico.

Trenta ran in the 2018 Italian general election for the Five Star Movement (M5S) without being elected. In June 2018, she was appointed Italian Minister of Defence in the government of Giuseppe Conte, who led a cabinet composed by members of the M5S and Lega.

References

1967 births
People from Velletri
Sapienza University of Rome alumni
Female defence ministers
Italian Ministers of Defence
Women government ministers of Italy
Five Star Movement politicians
Italy of Values politicians
Conte I Cabinet
Living people
21st-century Italian women politicians